Fred Joiner (November 26, 1929 – January 20, 2014) was an American politician. A member of the Democratic Party, he represented the 94th district in the Oklahoma House of Representatives.

Life and career 
Joiner was born in Boswell, Oklahoma, the son of Ethel and Barton Joiner. He attended Boswell High School and Southwestern Oklahoma State University.

In 1973, Joiner was elected to represent the 94th district in the Oklahoma House of Representatives, succeeding Ray Trent. He served until 1985, when he was succeeded by Gary Bastin.

Joiner died in January 2014, at the age of 84.

References 

1929 births
2014 deaths
20th-century American politicians
20th-century Members of the Oklahoma House of Representatives
Democratic Party members of the Oklahoma House of Representatives
Southwestern Oklahoma State University alumni